The Lake-class inshore patrol vessel (also known as the Rotoiti class and the Protector class) is a ship class of inshore patrol vessels (IPVs) of the Royal New Zealand Navy (RNZN) and the Irish Naval Service which replaced the RNZN's s in 2007–2008. All four vessels are named after New Zealand lakes.

Following long-running Navy retention problems in the wake of NZDF "civilianisation", two of the four vessels were tied up, inactive, in a 'Reduced Activity Period' for long periods between 2013 and 2018. In June 2019 the New Zealand Government announced that two of the patrol vessels would be withdrawn from service, and they were decommissioned in October that year.

Design and construction
Conceived as part of Project Protector, the Ministry of Defence acquisition project to acquire one multi-role vessel, two offshore and four inshore patrol vessels. The Project Protector vessels were to be operated by the RNZN to conduct tasks for and with the New Zealand Customs Service, the Department of Conservation, Ministry of Foreign Affairs and Trade, Ministry of Fisheries, Maritime New Zealand, and New Zealand Police. The future duties will include maritime surveillance and boarding, support to civilian agencies such as the customs service and search and rescue duties.

The ships were built in Whangarei by Tenix Defence, and are based on a modified search and rescue vessel for the Philippine Coast Guard, with a different superstructure design. The cost for the four vessels was planned to be NZ$100 million. Friction stir welding was used in the construction of the superstructure, and Donovan Group being the first New Zealand company to use the technique, which is credited as having won them the contract for this part of the vessel's construction.

Capabilities and features
The IPVs will normally be used for inshore tasks within  of the coastline. Together with their improved speed, this will be sufficient to intercept, for example, large off-shore fishing trawlers working illegally in New Zealand waters. Each vessel was intended to achieve 290 available patrol days per year. 

The ships were intended to have the ability to patrol (including receiving vertical replenishment) in up to sea state 5 (seas rough, waves ) and have the ability to survive in conditions of up to sea state 8 (seas very high, waves ). However, boat deployment and recovery will be limited to sea state 4 (seas moderate, waves ). These parameters are much more capable than the Moa class which they replace. The shipbuilder claims "the vessel is more than capable of extending the Crown's operational envelope to southern ocean patrol duties".

Irish Naval Service
In August 2021, an article in the Irish Examiner reported that the Department of Defence (Ireland) is exploring the possibility of purchasing two of the Lake class inshore patrol vessels for the Irish Naval Service. It is reported that the ships would be used for fisheries protection and patrolling in the Irish Sea following Britain's exit from the European Union. The Lake class vessels are seen as ideal for the calmer conditions of the Irish Sea, which will allow the larger OPVs of the Irish Naval Fleet to focus on Atlantic Ocean operations.

On 13 March 2022 the Irish Department of Defence confirmed the acquisition of the two retired Lake-class IPVs, HMNZS Rotoiti and HMNZS Pukaki for €26 million. The two Lake-class ships will replace the Irish Naval vessels LÉ Orla and LÉ Ciara. Both Lake-class IPVs will undergo restoration work to bring them to Lloyd's Classification in New Zealand before being transported to Ireland in 2023.

These ships are expected to operate primarily in the Irish Sea and off Ireland's South East coast and will most likely be based in the port of Dún Laoghaire in County Dublin. The vessels may also undergo an armament upgrade from the current three 12.7mm HMGs, to a 30mm or 40mm main gun.

Ships in class

See also

References

External links

Inshore Patrol Vessels – HMNZ Ships Rotoiti, Taupo, Hawea and Pukaki

Patrol boat classes
Protector class IPV